Aquatics at the 1999 Southeast Asian Games included swimming, diving and water polo events. The three sports of aquatics were held at Hassanal Bolkiah Aquatics Center in Bandar Seri Begawan, Brunei Darussalam. Aquatics events was held between 8 August to 13 August.

Medal winners

Swimming
Men's events

Women's events

Diving

Water polo

References
http://jawawa.id/index.php?id=1440205&topic=454205
http://jawawa.id/index.php?id=1441595&topic=455595
http://jawawa.id/index.php?id=1440084&topic=454084
http://jawawa.id/index.php?id=1440749&topic=454749
http://jawawa.id/index.php?id=1440568&topic=454568

1999 Southeast Asian Games
1999